Alexis Okeowo is an American journalist who is a staff writer at The New Yorker. They are the author of A Moonless, Starless Sky: Ordinary Women and Men Fighting Extremism in Africa

Early life 
Okeowo grew up in Alabama, the child of Nigerian parents. They attended Princeton University, graduating in 2006.

Career 

From 2006-2007, Okeowo was a Princeton in Africa Fellow working at the New Vision newspaper in Uganda. In 2012, they won an Alicia Patterson Foundation Fellowship to write about gay rights in Africa. They became a staff writer at the New Yorker in 2015 and is working on a book about people standing up to extremism in Africa at the New America Foundation. Their 2017 book A Moonless, Starless Sky: Ordinary Women and Men Fighting Extremism in Africa was reviewed favorably.

Their work has appeared in the anthologies Best American Travel Writing 2017 and Best American Sports Writing 2017.

The Christian Science Monitor called Okeowo one of the "finest war and foreign correspondents" at The New Yorker: "Alexis Okeowo, who was named a staff writer in late 2015, is continuing the tradition of the foreign correspondent who takes considerable personal risks driven by the conviction that all stories deserve to be told, particularly those that require a great deal of courage to uncover in the first place."

Awards and honors
2014 Kurt Schork Memorial Award finalist 
2015 Livingston Award for international reporting, finalist.
2017 Elle magazine's 27 "best books", for A Moonless, Starless Sky 
2018 PEN/Open Book, winner for A Moonless, Starless Sky
2020 The Front Page Award for Journalist of the Year from the Newswomen's Club of New York

Bibliography

Books

Essays and reporting 
 
———————
Notes

References

External links

 A Moonless, Starless Sky at Hachette

Princeton University alumni
Living people
Year of birth missing (living people)
American people of Nigerian descent
The New Yorker staff writers
African-American women journalists
African-American journalists
Writers from Alabama
21st-century African-American people
21st-century African-American women